Hans Sommer may refer to:

Hans Sommer (composer) (1837–1922), opera composer
 (1904–2000), film music composer for Der Mann, der Sherlock Holmes war and other films
Hans Sommer (cyclist) (1924–2004), Swiss cyclist
Hans Sommer (SS officer) (1914–?), SS officer who dynamited the synagogues of Paris, later Cold War spy